Yip Tsz Chun (born 15 May 1985 in Hong Kong) is a former Hong Kong professional footballer who currently plays for Hong Kong First Division club Yuen Long. He is also the head coach of the club.

Yip mainly plays as a striker but has also played as a left winger on many occasions. He was also a member of the Hong Kong national futsal team.

Early years
Yip was born in Hong Kong. When he was young, he joined Hong Kong First Division team South China youth academy. However, after he finished the secondary studies, he was forced to stop his professional football career due to injuries. He only played in the Hong Kong Second Division League as a non-professional player.

Club career

Eastern
In 2007, Eastern was invited to promote to the Hong Kong First Division League. Eastern's coach Casemiro Mior invited Yip to join the club. Miro was the coach of South China's youth team and Yip was one of his former player. Eastern was also Yip's first professional club.

Mutual
After a season with Eastern, due to insufficient chances, Yip, alongside 7 other former Eastern players, joined the newly promoted team Mutual in the 2008–09 season.

Although he played most of the matches for Mutual, Mutual could not avoid relegation to the Second Division after a season in the top-tier league.

Pegasus
Since he was living in Yuen Long District, Pegasus, a team based in the district, signed Yip at the beginning of the 2009–10 season.

However, Yip was not given any chances, whilst at the same time, Yip could not attend training sessions in the evening as he had to attend school courses. He was released by the team after only staying half season with the team.

Tai Chung
Yip joined another First Division club Tai Chung after being released by Pegasus.

He was one of the key players of the club, but the team could not avoid relegation from the First Division.

Tuen Mun
He signed a contract with Tuen Mun at the beginning of the 2011–12 season.

On 30 October 2012, due to the divestment of Tuen Mun president Chan Keung, various key players, including Yip, and the whole coaching team were released by the club.

Pegasus
He signed for Pegasus on 1 January 2014.

Yuen Long
In 2015, he returned to his home town and signed for Hong Kong Premier League club Yuen Long.

International career

Hong Kong
After emerging as one of Tuen Mun's key players, Yip was called up to the senior squad. He played his first senior international match on 1 June 2012, an international friendly match against Singapore at Hong Kong Stadium.

Honours
Yuen Long
Hong Kong Senior Shield: 2017–18

Career statistics

Club
 As of 28 October 2012

International

References

External links
 

1985 births
Living people
Association football forwards
Hong Kong footballers
Hong Kong football managers
Hong Kong international footballers
Tuen Mun SA players
TSW Pegasus FC players
Tai Chung FC players
Mutual FC players
Eastern Sports Club footballers
Yuen Long FC players
Hong Kong First Division League players
Hong Kong Premier League players